Wescott is an unincorporated community in Custer County, Nebraska, United States.

History
Wescott was founded by Walter S. Wescott in 1886. A post office was established at Wescott in 1888, and remained in operation until it was discontinued in 1901.

References

Unincorporated communities in Custer County, Nebraska
Unincorporated communities in Nebraska